Milanov is a Slavic masculine surname originating from the root "mil-", meaning "dear", "cute"; its feminine counterpart is Milanova. It may refer to the following notable people:
 Anna Milanova (born 1978), Bulgarian volleyball player
Dimitar Milanov (1928–1995), Bulgarian football player
Georgi Milanov (footballer) (born 1992), Bulgarian football player
Georgi Milanov (ice hockey) (1952–2014), Bulgarian ice hockey player
Iliya Milanov (born 1992), Bulgarian football player
Kiril Milanov (1948–2011), Bulgarian football player
 Ľudmila Milanová (born 1967), Slovakian former alpine skier
Martin Milanov (born 1978), Bulgarian ice hockey player
 Natália Milanová (born 1982), Slovakian politician
Philip Milanov (born 1991), Belgian discus thrower
Rossen Milanov, Bulgarian conductor
Stoika Milanova (born 1945), Bulgarian classical violinist 
 Tamara Milanova (born 1983), Georgian singer
 Vanya Milanova (born 1954), Bulgarian violinist
Yordan Milanov (1867–1932), Bulgarian architect
Yordan Milanov (officer) (born 1924), Bulgarian military officer
Zhivko Milanov (born 1984), Bulgarian football player
Zinka Milanov (1906–1989), Croatian opera singer

References

Bulgarian-language surnames
Patronymic surnames
Surnames from given names